The Cintas Center is a 10,250-seat multi-purpose arena and conference center at Xavier University in Cincinnati, Ohio. The arena officially opened in 2000 and was constructed through private donations as part of Xavier University's Century Campaign. It is home to the Xavier University Musketeers basketball and volleyball teams. It is named for the uniform company Cintas.

Facility
In the spring of 2009, Cintas Center was voted the 3rd "Toughest Place to Play" in a poll conducted by EA Sports.

Cintas Center hosted the Atlantic 10 (A10) Women's Basketball Championship in 2007 and 1st & 2nd Round games of the 2010 and 2011 NCAA Women's Division I Basketball Championship.  Cintas Center also hosted the A10 Women's Volleyball Championship in 2010 and is a perennial site for OHSAA boys' basketball state tournament games. It has also hosted Cleveland Cavaliers preseason games since 2014.

On November 2, 2014, Xavier gave nearby Mount St. Joseph University free use of the arena for the school's women's basketball game with Hiram College. The game had been rescheduled, with NCAA approval, to allow terminally ill Mount St. Joseph player Lauren Hill to play in a college game. The game also served as a charity fundraiser for research into diffuse intrinsic pontine glioma, the brain cancer from which Hill was suffering.  On April 13, 2015, the arena hosted a public memorial service for Hill following her death three days earlier. Later that year, the two schools launched the Lauren Hill Tipoff Classic, an annual season-opening event featuring both schools' women's teams, at the arena.

Within the main arena are 22 luxury boxes as well as the Joseph Club, a VIP bar overlooking the court.  A practice facility, the Kohlhepp Family Auxiliary Gym, is attached to the arena and is used by the athletic teams, as well as being used as additional event space when needed.  There are also state-of-the-art weight and training rooms as well as 4 large locker rooms.  There is a media room that is used as a work room and for press conferences.  The 2014-15 season saw a new design for the basketball floor to include the Cincinnati skyline.  The arena saw a multimillion-dollar technology upgrade during the summer of 2010.  A new, 10mm centerhung Mitsubishi DiamondVision video board was installed along with 16.5mm LSI/SACO scoring panels, a 360° ring and almost 600' of LED fascia ribbon board.  An auxiliary scoreboard was also installed on the north wall of the arena.  The luxury suites and Joseph Club were also renovated. Following the 2016 season, the basketball floor was updated to remove the skyline.

As a concert venue Cintas Center can seat as few as 2,000 or as many as 10,000. The arena features  of space. It also is used for trade shows, conventions, and corporate meetings, among other events.  Cintas Center also hosts upwards of 30 graduations each year.

Xavier Men's Basketball 
The main tenant of Cintas Center is the Xavier University Men's basketball team.

As of March 2019 the Musketeers have compiled a 258–41 (.863) record since moving to its on-campus home for the 2000-01 season. Xavier enjoyed a 15–0 mark at home during the 2009–10, its only perfect record for a season at Cintas Center. During the 2017-2018 season, the Musketeers set a Cintas Center record with 17 home victories. Cintas Center continues to be one of the best home-court advantages in the NCAA and was named the #3 Toughest Place to Play on EA Sports' NCAA Basketball '10.

Through the 2018-2019 season, Cintas Center has hosted 3,011,308 fans for Xavier home games and the Musketeers have averaged 10,071 fans (better than 98% capacity) per game during that time. The 2017-2018 season marked the highest average attendance in Cintas Center history with an average 10,475 (over 102% capacity) Musketeer fans at each home game.

*Attendance limited due to Covid-19 Restrictions

Concerts, Performers & Speakers at Cintas Center
 Bob Dylan
 Jimmy Fallon
 Michael Moore
 Dave Chappelle
 Trey Anastasio
 Cornel West
 Talib Kweli
 Guster
 Anberlin
 Chuck D
 Paul Rusesabagina
 Sr. Helen Prejean
 Ben Folds
 Andrew Bird
 O.A.R.
 The Isley Brothers
 Jane Goodall
 Paula Deen
 John Boehner
 Robert F. Kennedy, Jr.
 Demetri Martin
 Ann Coulter
 fun.
 Jack's Mannequin
 Dane Cook
 Aaron Feuerstein
 Jason Mraz
 Sarah Brightman
 The Wiggles
 Dave Ramsey
 Blessid Union of Souls
 Sean Hannity
 Jim Rome
 The Wreckers
 Taking Back Sunday
 Fr. John Corapi
 Elie Wiesel
 Filming location for the 2011 movie The Ides of March
Neon Trees
Owl City

Schiff Family Conference Center and Duff Banquet Center
The Schiff Family Conference Center has  of meeting space spread across 5 conference rooms and 1 executive board room. One floor below is the  James & Caroline Duff Banquet Center.

See also
 List of NCAA Division I basketball arenas

References

External links
 Cintas Center
 Xavier University
 GoXavier.com - Home of Xavier Athletics

2000 establishments in Ohio
Basketball venues in Ohio
College basketball venues in the United States
College volleyball venues in the United States
Convention centers in Ohio
Sports venues completed in 2000
Sports venues in Cincinnati
Xavier Musketeers basketball venues